La très très grande entreprise (English title: The Very Very Big Company) is a French comedy film directed by Pierre Jolivet and released in France in November 2008. It is an indirect follow-up to his film Ma petite entreprise, the story of which is set nine years before that of La très très grande entreprise.

Synopsis
Four friends - an oyster-farmer, an accountant's assistant, a restaurateur and a blue-collar worker - decide to take on a multi-national agro-chemical company with a turnover of €9bn and which has been polluting their region on a large scale. Having been awarded a paltry amount of compensation, they decide to seek true justice. They have however just 30 days to uncover vital new evidence ...

Cast

 Roschdy Zem : Zak
 Marie Gillain : Mélanie
 Jean-Paul Rouve : Denis
 Adrien Jolivet : Kevin
 Guilaine Londez : Brigitte Lamarcq
 Arlette Thomas : Mme de Marthod
 Wilfried Romoli : Romolli
 Vikash Dhorasoo : Sanjay
 Nicolas Marié : Lawyer Dessax
 Anne Loiret : Sophie Dantec
 Eric Prat : Boisselier
 Denis Ménochet : Gilles
 Cyril Couton : Philippe Malzieux
 Scali Delpeyrat : Boissy D'Anglas
 Ludovic Bergery : Philippe
 Serge Larivière : M. Andretti

References

External links
 

2008 films
French comedy films
2000s French-language films
2000s French films